Surprise Sur Prise was a Canadian TV show of the Candid Camera pranks genre. The same distributor also distributes Just for Laughs: Gags.

International editions
 France: Surprise sur prise
Poland: Mamy Cię!
 Germany: Verstehen Sie Spaß?

References

Hidden camera television series